XAMPP ( or ) is a free and open-source cross-platform web server solution stack package developed by Apache Friends, consisting mainly of the Apache HTTP Server, MariaDB database, and interpreters for scripts written in the PHP and Perl programming languages. Since most actual web server deployments use the same components as XAMPP, it makes transitioning from a local test server to a live server possible.

XAMPP's ease of deployment means a WAMP or LAMP stack can be installed quickly and simply on an operating system by a developer, with the advantage that common add-in applications such as WordPress and Joomla! can also be installed with similar ease using Bitnami.

Etymology
The term XAMPP is an apparent acronym. However, there is no official acronym expansion specified on the Apache Friends website. Their homepage header reads "XAMPP Apache + MariaDB + PHP + Perl", indicating that this abbreviation is a recursive acronym.

The term can be unofficially broken down as follows:

MySQL was replaced with MariaDB on 19 October 2015 and beginning with XAMPP versions 5.5.30 and 5.6.14, effectively altering the meaning of the acronym.

While both letters P are de facto interchangeable, the convention used at the Apache Friends website indicates that the first letter P is short for PHP and the latter letter P is short for Perl.

Prerequisites 
XAMPP requires only one zip, tar, 7z, or exe file to be downloaded and run, and little or no configuration of the various components that make up the web server is required. The Windows version of XAMPP requires Microsoft Visual C++ 2017 Redistributable.

Features 
XAMPP is regularly updated to the latest releases of Apache, MariaDB, PHP and Perl. It also comes with a number of other modules, including OpenSSL, phpMyAdmin, MediaWiki, Joomla, WordPress and more. Self-contained, multiple instances of XAMPP can exist on a single computer, and any given instance can be copied from one computer to another. XAMPP is offered in both a full and a standard version (Smaller version).

Usage
The most obvious characteristic of XAMPP is the ease at which a WAMP webserver stack can be deployed and instantiated.  Later, some common packaged applications that could be easily installed were provided by Bitnami.

Officially, XAMPP's designers intended it for use only as a development tool, to allow website designers and programmers to test their work on their own computers without any access to the Internet. To make this as easy as possible, many important security features are disabled by default. XAMPP has the ability to serve web pages on the World Wide Web. A special tool is provided to password-protect the most important parts of the package.

XAMPP also provides support for creating and manipulating databases in MariaDB and SQLite, among others.

Once XAMPP is installed, it is possible to treat a local host like a remote host by connecting using an FTP client.  Using a program like FileZilla has many advantages when installing a content management system (CMS) like Joomla or WordPress. It is also possible to connect to localhost via FTP with an HTML editor.

Components

See also

  Comparison of web server software
  Lighttpd
  List of Apache–MySQL–PHP packages
  List of Nginx–MySQL–PHP packages

References

External links
 
 Interview with Kai Seidler from the XAMPP project  — interview by Lenz Grimmer, MySQL
 Installing, Configuring, and Developing with XAMPP — article by Dalibor D. Dvorski, Skills Canada - Ontario
 Acronym of XAMPP — Taken from Abbreviations.com, a site by STANDS4 LLC
 XAMPP In General — article by Owusu-Ansah Godfred, Global Health Data Management

Free web server software
Portable software
WAMP
Web server software
Drupal
WordPress